Mugur-Aksy (Mugur-Aksı) is a rural locality (a selo) and the administrative center of Mongun-Tayginsky District of Tuva, Russia. Population:

References

Notes

Sources

Rural localities in Tuva